The News Virginian is a newspaper owned by Lee Enterprises.  The paper serves residents in the cities of Waynesboro and Staunton, Virginia, as well as Augusta and Nelson counties.

History
The News Virginian traces its publishing history to the Valley Virginian, which issued its first edition in 1901. The Valley Virginian consolidated with the Waynesboro News in November 1929, becoming the Waynesboro News-Virginian by owner / publisher Louis Spilman. In 1960, the paper took on its current moniker of The News Virginian.

References

External links 
 
 

1901 establishments in Virginia
Lee Enterprises publications
Daily newspapers published in Virginia
Newspapers established in 1901
Waynesboro, Virginia